London Buses route 68 is a Transport for London contracted bus route in London, England. Running between West Norwood station and Euston bus station, it is operated by Abellio London. The express service X68 is operated by London Central.

History

In the early period of motor omnibus travel, before World War I, number 68 was not in use as a route for the London General Omnibus Company, even though higher numbers up to 93 were active in 1912, for example.

The route was active at the start of World War II. During this war, its usual peacetime lighting of a pale blue colour was removed because of the risk of aerial bombing, and the buses were blacked-out.

By 1952, after the last trams stopped running, the route ran from the Earl of Eldon public house in South Croydon to Chalk Farm station in what is now Camden. This was a long 15 mile journey via places such as Thornton Heath, Norwood, Herne Hill, Camberwell, Elephant & Castle, Waterloo and Euston station, which nowadays would require two changes of bus. The route started operating AEC Routemaster buses on Sundays in 1963 and switched to full Routemaster operation in 1970. The buses at this time were based in garages in Chalk Farm, Norwood and Croydon.

Upon being re-tendered, on 1 April 2006 routes 68 and X68 passed from Arriva London to London Central.

The journalist Peter Watts reviewed his experiences of the current service for Time Out. He travels regularly from Herne Hill to Great Russell Street, near the Time Out offices in Tottenham Court Road. The journey takes between 40 and 90 minutes depending upon the congestion in traffic bottlenecks like Camberwell Green. Often, when the service is running poorly, it will terminate short of the final destination, unloading at a stop like Aldwych, or it will pass by Herne Hill without stopping, forcing passengers to take the shorter route 468 instead. Such incidents commonly occur three times a week and so cause him much frustration.

Author and journalist Simon Jenkins on the other hand described the 68 bus as the "Queen of buses" for its stately progress through the bustling shopping streets of South London.

Route 68 has a parallel peak-hour express service, X68, which runs along the same route from West Croydon station as far as Russell Square. This is one of only four express bus services provided by Transport for London, along with routes 607, X26 and X140.

Travelling on this bus route has been suggested as a cure for agoraphobia. Travelling for 2-5 stops during the day was considered a medium level exercise, while travelling from Camberwell Green to the Elephant & Castle alone during the rush hour, was considered the most challenging exercise - more terrifying than walking down the high street or shopping in a supermarket.

New Routemasters were introduced on the route from 5 February 2016.

In October 2021, the frequency of the service was reduced from seven or eight buses per hour to six.

Notable passengers
The spies Harry Houghton and Ethel Gee were trailed by a Special Branch agent when they travelled on the 68 between Waterloo Road and Walworth Road.
Simon Jenkins - journalist and author.

Current route

68
Route 68 operates via these primary locations: 
West Norwood station Knights Hill 
Tulse Hill station  
Brockwell Park
Herne Hill station 
King's College Hospital
Denmark Hill station  
Camberwell Green
Walworth
Elephant & Castle station  
St George's Circus
Waterloo station  
South Bank
Waterloo Bridge
Aldwych
Holborn station 
Russell Square station  
Tavistock Square
Euston bus station  for Euston station

X68
Route X68 operates via these primary locations: 
West Croydon station    
Selhurst Park Stadium
Beulah Hill
West Norwood station 
Waterloo station  
South Bank
Waterloo Bridge
Aldwych
Holborn station 
Southampton Row Russell Square

References

External links

Bus routes in London
Transport in the London Borough of Camden
Transport in the London Borough of Lambeth
Transport in the London Borough of Southwark